GPCC can refer to:
 Gujarat Pradesh Congress Committee
 Global Precipitation Climatology Centre, a global meteorological data centre hosted at Deutscher Wetterdienst